This is a list of military units taking part in the Warsaw Uprising, a Polish insurrection during the Second World War that began on August 1, 1944.

Polish units 
Many of the Home Army units were formed before the beginning of the Uprising; several were organised in the following days as new volunteers joined.

Units were assigned to given areas, namely:
 Area I (Śródmieście, Stare Miasto)
 Area II (Żoliborz, Marymont, Bielany)
 Area III (Wola)
 Area IV (Ochota)
 Area V (Mokotów)
 Area VI (Praga)
 Area VII (Powiat Warszawski)
 Zgrupowanie KeDywu Komendy Głównej
Units were organised into battalions, companies and platoons. Many of those became famous either before the Uprising or during it, including 'Battalion Zośka', 'Czata 49', 'Parasol', and 'Miotła'.

Armaments 
On August 1, the Home Army's arsenal consisted of:
 1,000 rifles
 1,700 pistols
 300 machine pistols
 60 submachine guns
 7 machine guns
 35 anti-tank guns
 25,000 hand grenades

Types of weapons used can be divided into the following categories:
 Polish Army weapons hidden after the invasion of Poland (FB Vis, Model 98a rifle, Karabinek wz. 1929, Browning wz. 1928, etc.)
 Homemade weaponry (Błyskawica, K pattern flamethrower, sidolówka, filipinka, Molotov cocktails, etc.)
 Weapons scavenged from the Wehrmacht (Luger pistol, Karabiner 98k, MP 40, etc.)
 Weapons bought directly from the Germans or on the black market
 Weapons from Allied forces, primarily supplied via airdrop (M1911 pistol, Sten, Bren, PIAT, etc.).

Complete List of Home Army groups in the Warsaw Uprising
The following list does not correspond with the above area list.

On September 20 this structure was reorganised to fit the structure of Polish forces fighting among the Western Allies. The entire force was renamed to Warsaw Home Army Corps (Warszawski Korpus Armii Krajowej), commanded by general Antoni Chruściel (Monter) and consisted of three infantry divisions:
 8th Romuald Traugutt Infantry Division (8 Dywizja Piechoty im. Romualda Traugutta) commanded by col. Żywiciel-Niedzielski
 10th Maciej Rataj Infantry Division (10 Dywizja Piechoty im. Macieja Rataja) commanded by col. Radwan-Pleiffer
 28th Stefan Okrzeja Infantry Division (28 Dywizja Piechoty im. Stefana Okrzei) commanded by col. Karol-Rokicki
The names of smaller units (battalions, companies and platoons) were left intact (as in the above table).

Composition of smaller fighting forces 
Although the vast majority of the resistance in Warsaw were members of Home Army, there was a small number of fighters who weren't members of that organisation. In the course of the Uprising some 1,700 members of other resistance organisations joined the Uprising. Those included the Armia Ludowa, Gwardia Ludowa and Narodowe Siły Zbrojne.

Along with the Polish soldiers who took part in the Uprising, there were also members of other nationalities. Among them was a number of Hungarian deserters and Italian escapees from POW camps in Poland. Another ex-POW soldier was RAF Sgt. John Ward, whose numerous coded radio dispatches gave an eyewitness account of the fighting to the British government and Polish government-in-exile, as well as the London press. There was also a Slovak 535th Home Army platoon under Lt. Stanko. It was composed mostly of Slovaks, Georgians, Armenians and Azeri, and suffered heavy casualties in the course of the uprising (up to 70%).

It is believed that some 25,000 Jews were hiding in Warsaw before the Uprising. The vast majority of them died together with other Polish civilians. However, many Jews (possibly as many as 1,000), including those released by Home Army from the Warsaw concentration camp (Gęsiówka), joined the Home Army. During the final stage of the battle a number of Soviet soldiers (possibly as many as 3,000, most of them members of Polish units in Soviet army) also crossed the river and fought the Germans in Powiśle area. Airdrops were carried out by allied airmen from Italy, mostly by Poles, Canadians and the British.

German units 
As of 23 August 1944 the German units directly involved with fights in Warsaw were divided into:
 Kampfgruppe Rohr (commanded by general major Rohr)
 Kampfgruppe Reinefarth (commanded by SS-Gruppenführer Heinz Reinefarth)
 Sturmgruppe Dirlewanger (commanded by SS-Oberführer der Reserve Oskar Dirlewanger)
 Sturmgruppe Reck (commanded by Major Reck)
 Sturmgruppe Schmidt (commanded by Colonel Schmidt)
 various support and backup units
 Warsaw Garrison (Group of Warsaw Commandant) commanded by Lieutenant General Stahel
A large section of the forces on the "German" side were, according to Norman Davies, drawn from "'collaborationist forces'" including Russians who had left in the Tzar's era and Azeris.

References 

 Jerzy Kirchmayer. Powstanie Warszawskie. Książka i Wiedza, Warsaw, 1959. . Hardcover, 576 pages.

Warsaw Uprising
Uprising
Warsaw Uprising
Warsaw Uprising